Abdul Maalik Wazir is a Pakistani politician who had been a member of the National Assembly of Pakistan from 2002 to 2013.

Political career

He was elected to the National Assembly of Pakistan from Constituency NA-41 (Tribal Area-VI) as an independent candidate in 2002 Pakistani general election. He received 8,005 votes and defeated an independent candidate, Muhammad Saleh Shah.

He was re-elected to the National Assembly from Constituency NA-41 (Tribal Area-VI) as an independent candidate in 2008 Pakistani general election. He received 7,957 votes and defeated Ghalib Khan. He was criticized for his poor performance during his tenure as Member of the National Assembly.

He ran for the seat of the National Assembly from Constituency NA-41 (Tribal Area-VI) as a candidate of Jamiat Ulema-e Islam (F) (JUI-F) in 2013 Pakistani general election but was unsuccessful. He received 3,045 votes and lost the seat to Ghalib Khan.

References

Living people
Pakistani MNAs 2002–2007
Pakistani MNAs 2008–2013
People from South Waziristan
Year of birth missing (living people)